The San Jose Hills are a part of the Transverse Ranges in eastern Los Angeles County, California, marking the border between the San Gabriel Valley and the Pomona Valley. It includes portions of Covina, West Covina, Walnut, Pomona, and San Dimas. To the south, the valley of San Jose Creek (a line followed by the Pomona Freeway) separates the San Jose Hills from the Puente Hills and Chino Hills.

History 
The Tongva village of Tooypinga was located at the base of the San Jose Hills. The village was destroyed by Spanish soldiers prior to 1785 as part of a raid, who frequently conducted sweeps of the Los Angeles Basin abducting children to San Gabriel Mission and raping women.

Geology 
The San Jose Hills are part of the geologic history of Southern California. The San Gabriel Mountains (the Transverse ranges located north of the San Jose Hills) were uplifted by tectonic force as a result of the colliding Pacific and North American plates more than a billion years ago. This tectonic pressure created deeply fractured and fissured sheets of rock that began to shift direction about 25 million years ago. Gradually, a portion of this fissured rock began to uplift from the ocean, forming the Los Angeles Basin. Further folding and fissures helped form other uplifts that include both the San Jose Hills and Puente Hills. These hills, prone to erosion, were formed with their domed appearance while still submerged under water. The San Jose Hills Fault has the possible magnitude of 6.0 to 6.5 and last was active in 1990.

The highest elevations are composed of conglomerate rock with small, shallow patches of soil. At the bases, silty clay loam dominates. These geologic conditions restrain water absorption towards the rockier higher elevations, which allow runoff to hydrate the base, creating a more habitable (friendly) environment for plants. Because of the transverse (east-west) orientation of the range, this effect is pronounced on the north slope due to the lower rates of evaporation caused by sunlight directed from the south.

Plant communities and wildlife 
The San Jose Hills are diverse with unique and rare plant communities. The dominant plant community is coastal sage scrub, known for its high adaptations for long dry summers and is drought deciduous. Prickly-pear cactus can also be found there. Above , chaparral makes its appearance, which differs from the sage scrub by being evergreen.  Along the northern slopes, especially in the cracks and valleys, one can find coast oak and Southern California black walnut woodlands. Southern California black walnut woodlands are increasingly rare and threatened. The largest strands of this community are in the San Jose Hills and Puente Hills to the south.

Mammals, birds, reptiles, and amphibians are very diverse in both the San Jose Hills and surrounding San Gabriel Valley.  Mammals in the San Jose Hills include bobcats, coyotes, gray fox, skunks, opossums, squirrels, and other rodents.  The bird diversity is exceptional, and notable species include California quail, least Bell's vireo, coastal California gnatcatcher, grasshopper sparrow, southwest willow flycatcher, and red-tailed hawk.   Reptiles and amphibians include various lizards and snakes, the California red-legged frog, southwestern arroyo toad, southwestern pond turtle, and other frogs and salamanders.

Culture and recreation 
On the most northeastern border, Fairplex (Los Angeles County Fairgrounds) offers an annual L.A. County Fair and other events throughout the year.  Fairplex is also the location of both the Los Angeles County Railroad Museum and the Wally Parks NHRA Motorsports Museum. Automotive racing enthusiasts can enjoy adjacent Pomona Raceway-Dragstrip.

Two parks with significant natural areas are located in the eastern portion of the San Jose Hills;  Ganesha Park include four picnic pavilions, a community center, amphitheater style band Shell, Olympic size swimming pool with slide, basketball courts, two lighted tennis courts, wildlife and hiking areas, and restroom facilities.  Frank G. Bonelli park has  Puddingstone Lake used for swimming, water skiing, wind surfing, and sailing.  The lake is also stocked with trout, bluegill, catfish, and large-mouth bass.  Raging Waters, a water theme park, is located at the north end of the lake.  There are boat rentals, hot tubs, an equestrian center and a wedding chapel.  Bonelli park facilities include vehicle camp sites, trails for hiking, biking and horseback riding, play equipment, gazebos, and group rental picnic areas.

East of Bonelli park is Mountain Meadows Golf Course, and on the west, Via Verde Country Club, the later that is south of Walnut Creek Park, a small park along Walnut Creek (which drains both Puddingstone and nearby San Gabriel Mountains into the San Gabriel River).

Several large institutions of higher education are located in the hills.  These include the California Polytechnic State University, Pomona (Cal Poly Pomona); Mount San Antonio College (Mt. SAC), and Pacific West Bible College.  The Voorhis Ecological Reserve in the northwest part of the Cal Poly Pomona campus and contains 31 ha of coastal sage scrub and oak woodland.  Biotrek is an educational program ran by the Biological Sciences Department.  Biotrek includes a Rainforest greenhouse, a native plant garden, aquatic environments, and laboratories.  Mt. Sac has a  native Wildlife Sanctuary.

Interment is provided by Forest Lawn Memorial Park and Mortuary. Near the Grand Avenue Corridor, Heritage Gardens Historical Park, located on the north slope, was recently redeveloped to include new hiking trails. Walnut Ranch Park can be found on the south slope.

Along Citrus Avenue, one can find South Hills Country Club. Three parks exists along the south slopes:  Shadow Oak Park, Creekside Park, and Gringrich Park. On the western portion of the hills is the Industry Hills Recreation Center and smaller Rimgrove and Woodgrove parks. The southern slope is West Covina's newest development, Big League Dreams. This mega-sports complex was built on top of a superfund site, the old BKK landfill.

References

External links 
Parks and open space
 Frank G. Bonelli Park
 Galster Wilderness Park Nature Center
 Mountain Meadows Golf Course
 Via Verde Country Club
 South Hills Country Club
Other
 Los Angeles County Fair
 California State Polytechnic University, Pomona
 Mt. San Antonio College
 Walley Parks NHRA Motorsports Museum
 Pomona Raceway
 Raging Waters

Mountain ranges of Los Angeles County, California
Transverse Ranges
Hills of California
Geography of the San Gabriel Valley
Geography of Pomona, California
Pomona Valley
Covina, California
San Dimas, California
Walnut, California
West Covina, California
Mountain ranges of Southern California